Aylton Filipe Boa Morte (born 23 September 1993) is a Portuguese professional footballer who plays as a winger for Emirati club Khor Fakkan Club.

Club career

Estoril
Born in Almada, Setúbal District of São Toméan descent, Boa Morte played lower league football until the age of 23. On 15 June 2017, he moved straight to the Primeira Liga after signing a three-year contract with G.D. Estoril Praia.

Boa Morte played his first match in the Portuguese top division on 9 August 2017, coming on as a late substitute in a 4–0 away loss against FC Porto. In January 2018, he was loaned to LigaPro club C.D. Cova da Piedade for five months.

Portimonense
In another winter transfer window move, Boa Morte joined Portimonense S.C. on 31 January 2019. He scored his first top-tier goal on 10 March in a 5–1 home rout of C.D. Nacional, and repeated the feat the following matchday at Belenenses SAD (2–2).

Personal life
Boa Morte's uncle, Luís, was also a footballer. He spent several years as a professional in England, and was a longtime Portuguese international.

References

External links

1993 births
Living people
Portuguese people of São Tomé and Príncipe descent
Sportspeople from Almada
Black Portuguese sportspeople
Portuguese footballers
Association football wingers
Primeira Liga players
Liga Portugal 2 players
Segunda Divisão players
C.D. Pinhalnovense players
G.D. Joane players
G.D. Ribeirão players
F.C. Tirsense players
S.C. Salgueiros players
G.D. Estoril Praia players
C.D. Cova da Piedade players
Portimonense S.C. players
UAE Pro League players
Khor Fakkan Sports Club players
Portuguese expatriate footballers
Expatriate footballers in the United Arab Emirates
Portuguese expatriate sportspeople in the United Arab Emirates